Chief Ernest Adegunle Oladeinde Shonekan  (9 May 1936 – 11 January 2022) was a Nigerian lawyer and statesman who served as the interim head of state of Nigeria from 26 August 1993 to 17 November 1993. He was titled Abese of Egbaland from 1981 (in addition to a variety of other chieftaincy titles).

Prior to his political career, Shonekan was the chairman and chief executive of the United African Company of Nigeria (successor of The Niger Company), a vast Nigerian conglomerate, which at the time was the largest African-controlled company in Sub-Saharan Africa.

Early life
Shonekan was born in Lagos on 9 May 1936. The son of an Abeokuta-born civil servant, he was one of six children born into the family.

Shonekan was educated at CMS Grammar School and Igbobi College. He received a law degree from the University of London, and was called to the bar. He later attended Harvard Business School.

Early business career

Shonekan joined the United Africa Company of Nigeria in 1964, at the time a subsidiary of the United Africa Company which played a prominent role in British colonisation. He rose through the ranks in the company and was promoted to assistant legal adviser. He later became a deputy adviser and joined the board of directors at the age of 40. He was made chairman and managing director in 1980, and went on to cultivate a wide array of international business and political connections.

Crisis of the Third Republic 

On 2 January 1993, Shonekan assumed office simultaneously as head of transitional council and head of government under Ibrahim Babangida. At the time, the transitional council was designed to be the final phase leading to a scheduled hand over to an elected democratic leader of the Third Nigerian Republic.

Shonekan learned of the dire condition of government finances, which he was unable to correct. The government was hard pressed on international debt obligations and had to hold constant talks for debt rescheduling.

In August 1993, Babangida resigned from office, following the annulment of the 12 June elections. He signed a decree establishing the Interim National Government led by Shonekan who was subsequently sworn-in as head of state.

Interim government

Shonekan was unable to control the political crisis which ensued following the election annulment. During his few months in power, he tried to schedule another presidential election and a return to democratic rule, while his government was hampered by a national workers' strike. Opposition leader Moshood Abiola, viewed Shonekan's interim government as illegitimate. Shonekan released political prisoners detained by Babangida. Shonekan's administration introduced a bill to repeal three major draconian decrees of the military government. Babangida made the interim government weak by placing it under the control of the military.

Shonekan had lobbied for debt cancellation but, after the election annulment, most of the Western powers had imposed economic sanctions on Nigeria. Inflation was uncontrollable and most non-oil foreign investment disappeared. The government also initiated an audit of the accounts of NNPC, the oil giant, an organisation that had many operational inefficiencies. Shonekan served as an executive of Royal Dutch Shell while acting as the interim president of Nigeria.

Shonekan tried to set a timetable for troop withdrawal from ECOMOG's peacekeeping mission in Liberia. General Sani Abacha, was the minister of defence and chief of defence staff who had full control over the military.

Out of office
In November 1993, three months into his administration, Shonekan was overthrown in palace coup by Abacha.

In 1993, he along with other prominent Nigerians and expatriates, founded the Nigerian Economic Summit Group an advocacy group and think-tank for private sector-led development of the Nigerian economy.

Since then Shonekan went on to feature prominently as an elder statesman.

Personal life and death
Shonekan was married to Margaret Shonekan. He died on 11 January 2022, at the age of 85 at Evercare Hospital in Lagos. At the time of his death, he was the third oldest surviving Nigerian head of state by age after Elizabeth II and Yakubu Gowon.

Citations

General references 
 "Military swears in transitional government", Agence France Presse—English, 4 January 1993
 "Nigeria prepares medium-term plan", Financial Times (London, England), 28 January 1993
 "NIGERIA: HARD ROAD AHEAD FOR INTERIM GOVERNMENT", IPS-Inter Press Service, 26 August 1993

1936 births
2022 deaths
20th-century Nigerian businesspeople
20th-century Nigerian lawyers
21st-century Nigerian businesspeople
21st-century Nigerian lawyers
Alumni of the University of London
Businesspeople from Lagos
CMS Grammar School, Lagos alumni
Harvard Business School alumni
Heads of state of Nigeria
Lawyers from Lagos
Nigerian Anglicans
Nigerian chairpersons of corporations
Nigerian chief executives
Politicians from Lagos
Prime Ministers of Nigeria
United Africa Company
Yoruba businesspeople
Yoruba legal professionals
Yoruba politicians